James Horsburgh (28 September 176214 May 1836) was a Scottish hydrographer. He worked for the British East India Company, (EIC) and mapped many seaways around Singapore in the late 18th century and early 19th century.

Life
Born at Elie, Fife, Horsburgh went to sea at the age of 16 and was captured and imprisoned by the French at Dunkirk. After his release, he made voyages to the West Indies and Calcutta. In May 1786, aboard the EIC ship Atlas he sailed from Batavia to Ceylon as first mate and was subsequently shipwrecked on the island of Diego Garcia. This disaster influenced him in his decision to produce accurate maps after he found his way back to India and while on board another ship employed in trade with China.

James Horsburgh  was the author of the precisely titled Directions for Sailing to and from the East Indies, China, New Holland, Cape of Good Hope, and the interjacent Ports, compiled chiefly from original Journals and Observations made during 21 years' experience in navigating those Seas, also known as the 'India Directory'.

Horsburgh's Directory became the standard work for oriental navigation in the first half of the 19th century, until Robert Moresby's survey of the treacherous coral groups in the central Indian Ocean, when for the first time in history accurate maps of the areas that were in the way of the main trade routes: the Maldives, Chagos and Laccadives, were published. In March, 1806 he was elected a Fellow of the Royal Society

Legacy

Robert Moresby, during his survey of the Maldives in 1834, named a small atoll south of Southern Maalhosmadulhu Atoll after James Horsburgh as a homage to his valuable previous hydrographic work.

Horsburgh Island in the Cocos (Keeling) Islands is also named after him as is the Horsburgh Lighthouse, located on Pedra Branca, Singapore, the construction of which was funded by a group of British merchants in Canton, China (now Guangzhou).

Horsburgh was the first to document the island now known as Spratly Island, naming it Storm Island. However, Richard Spratly's sighting eventually become the vernacular and led to the naming of the entire region as the Spratly Islands.

Works

See also
Atolls of the Maldives
Alexander Dalrymple, 1st Hydrographer of the Navy
Fehendu / Fulhadu
Horsburgh Atoll
Robert Moresby

References

Bibliography

External links
Electric Scotland, a major educational resource on Scottish History.

1762 births
1834 deaths
Fellows of the Royal Society
People from Elie and Earlsferry
Scottish cartographers
Scottish hydrographers